The 1953 Copa del Generalísimo Juvenil was the third staging of the tournament. The competition began on May 17, 1953, and ended on June 30, 1953, with the final.

Preliminary round

|}

First round

|}

Second round

|}

Quarterfinals

|}

Semifinals

|}

Final

|}

Final Replay

|}

Real Madrid won with more corners.

Copa del Rey Juvenil de Fútbol
Juvenil